Marszewo may refer to the following places:
Marszewo, Konin County in Greater Poland Voivodeship (west-central Poland)
Marszewo, Nowy Tomyśl County in Greater Poland Voivodeship (west-central Poland)
Marszewo, Śrem County in Greater Poland Voivodeship (west-central Poland)
Marszewo, Pomeranian Voivodeship (north Poland)
Marszewo, Warmian-Masurian Voivodeship (north Poland)
Marszewo, Goleniów County in West Pomeranian Voivodeship (north-west Poland)
Marszewo, Sławno County in West Pomeranian Voivodeship (north-west Poland)